Biomechanical may refer to:

Biomechanics, the application of mechanical principles to living organisms
Sports biomechanics, a quantitative based study and analysis of professional athletes and sports' activities in general
Forensic Biomechanics, use of biomechanics in litigation.
Biomechanics (Meyerhold), system of actor training developed by Vsevolod Meyerhold
Biomechanical art, the style of H. R. Giger and those influenced by him, like tattooist Guy Aitchison
Biomechanical (band), a progressive groove metal band from London, UK
Biomechanical engineering, a bioengineering subdiscipline which applies principles of mechanical engineering to biological systems
Biomechanical Toy, a scrolling shoot 'em up platform arcade game released by Gaelco in 1995

It may also refer to:

Bioengineering, the application of concepts and methods of biology to solve real-world problems
Biomaterial, any matter, surface, or construct that interacts with biological systems
Biorobotics, a term that loosely covers the fields of cybernetics, bionics and even genetic engineering as a collective study
Bioship, an organic spaceship
Biomechanoid, a cyborg
Organic (model), methods and patterns found in living systems
Ocean Machine: Biomech, the debut 1997 studio album by Canadian musician Devin Townsend